The Town of Firestone is a Statutory Town in southwestern Weld County, Colorado, United States. The town population was 16,381 at the 2020 United States Census, a 61.44% increase since the 2010 United States Census. Firestone is a part of the Greeley, CO Metropolitan Statistical Area and the Front Range Urban Corridor.

History
The town was named for Jacob Firestone, a landowner. The town was incorporated in 1908.

Geography
Firestone is located at  (40.131295, -104.935990), or about 30 miles north of Denver.

At the 2020 United States Census, the town had a total area of  including  of water.

Demographics

As of the census of 2010, there were 10,147 people and 3,134 households in the town. The racial makeup of the town was 87.8% White, 0.7% African American, 0.8% Native American, 1.4% Asian, <0.1% Pacific Islander, and 3% from two or more races. Hispanic or Latino of any race were 16.2% of the population.

There were 621 households in 2000 out of which 44.0% had children under the age of 18 living with them, 67.8% were married couples living together, 10.0% had a female householder with no husband present, and 19.0% were non-families. 13.8% of all households were made up of individuals, and 2.6% had someone living alone who was 65 years of age or older.  The average household size was 3.07 and the average family size was 3.41.

In the town, the population was spread out, with 31.7% under the age of 18, 7.8% from 18 to 24, 34.6% from 25 to 44, 21.4% from 45 to 64, and 4.6% who were 65 years of age or older.  The median age was 32 years. For every 100 females, there were 96.9 males.  For every 100 females age 18 and over, there were 100.3 males.

In 2000, the median income for a household in the town was $55,313, and the median income for a family was $59,219. Males had a median income of $37,230 versus $30,147 for females. The per capita income for the town was $20,428.  About 4.7% of families and 7.2% of the population were below the poverty line, including 10.9% of those under age 18 and 9.9% of those age 65 or over.

Points of interest
Firestone has more than thirty-five parks and twelve miles of scenic trail. The Firestone/Legacy Trail runs for more than twelve miles, much of that distance along a railroad right-of-way which once serviced the coal industry.

Public Schools
Firestone falls within the St. Vrain Valley School District, with three elementary schools (Centennial, Prairie Ridge, and Legacy) and one middle school (Coal Ridge). Students typically attend one of the two high schools that serve the Firestone locale: Mead High School or Frederick High School.

Notable people
 Eric Uptagrafft (born 1966), sport shooter

Notable Events
In April 2017, an explosion caused by an untapped gas well destroyed a home on Twilight Avenue, killing two people and seriously injuring a third. This incident prompted a state-wide discussion about fracking and drilling throughout the state. On May 24, 2018, the drilling company responsible for the blast, Anadarko Petroleum Corp., announced it had reached a settlement for an undisclosed sum with the family affected by the blast.

See also

Colorado
Bibliography of Colorado
Index of Colorado-related articles
Outline of Colorado
List of counties in Colorado
List of municipalities in Colorado
List of places in Colorado
List of statistical areas in Colorado
Front Range Urban Corridor
North Central Colorado Urban Area
Denver-Aurora, CO Combined Statistical Area
Greeley, CO Metropolitan Statistical Area

References

External links

Town of Firestone website
CDOT map of the Town of Firestone

Towns in Weld County, Colorado
Towns in Colorado